Yankuang Group Company Limited, restructured from Yanzhou Mining Bureau, was established in 1976. It is the fourth largest coal mining state-owned enterprise in People's Republic of China. In 1999, Yanzhou Mining Bureau was renamed to Yankuang Group Company Limited. It is not only engaged in coal production and sales, coal chemicals, civil engineering, machinery manufacturing, transportation and electricity, but also garment business and trade. Its headquarters is located at Jining, Shandong.

Its subsidiary company, Yanzhou Coal Mining Company Limited, is listed on New York Stock Exchange, Hong Kong Stock Exchange and Shanghai Stock Exchange respectively in 1998.

References

External links

Yankuang Group Company Limited

Coal companies of China
Conglomerate companies of China
Government-owned companies of China
Companies based in Shandong
Conglomerate companies established in 1976
Energy companies established in 1976
Non-renewable resource companies established in 1976
Chinese companies established in 1976